Ocurí Municipality is the fourth municipal section of the Chayanta Province in the Potosí Department in Bolivia. Its seat is Ocurí.

Subdivision 
The municipality consists of the following cantons: 
 Chairapata
 Maragua
 Marcoma
 Ocurí

The people 
The people are predominantly indigenous citizens of Quechua descent.

See also 
 Lluxita
 Siwinqani

References

External links 
Ocurí Municipality: population data and map

Municipalities of Potosí Department